Christine C. Ross (née Beattie; born 24 July 1964) is a former New Zealand rugby union player. A fullback, she debuted for the New Zealand women's national side, the Black Ferns, in 1989 against the visiting California Grizzlies at Christchurch. She represented New Zealand at RugbyFest 1990 and at the inaugural 1991 Women's Rugby World Cup.

Personal life 
Ross is the niece of Eru Beattie, who was a member of the New Zealand Māori rugby team in 1966. She is married to former All Black Jock Ross, and their children include Isaac Ross, who was also an All Black, and Adam Ross, who represented New Zealand in rugby at under-19 level.

References 

1964 births
Living people
Rugby union players from Hastings, New Zealand
People educated at Karamu High School
New Zealand women's international rugby union players
New Zealand female rugby union players
Rugby union fullbacks
New Zealand Māori rugby union players
Ngāti Kahungunu people